The Humanoid Robotics Project (HRP) is a project  for development of general domestic helper robots, sponsored by Japan's Ministry of Economy, Trade and Industry (METI) and New Energy and Industrial Technology Development Organization (NEDO), spearheaded by Kawada Industries and supported by the National Institute of Advanced Industrial Science and Technology (AIST) and Kawasaki Heavy Industries, Inc.  The HRP series also goes by the name Promet.  The HRP should not be confused with the HOAP series (Humanoid for Open Architecture Platform), which is manufactured by Fujitsu.

Features and technology 
The project started with three Honda P3 which were bought from Honda. And, the project developed them as the HRP-1 with original features, such as telecommand system.

An interesting feature HRP-2 has is the ability to stand up again after lying flat on the floor, either on its back or front—something Honda's ASIMO is not able to do.

AIST and Kawada Industries have also revealed the HRP-4 bipedal humanoid.  The HRP-4 stands 150 cm (5′) tall and weighs 39 kg (86 lbs).

Kawada Industries has also developed the NEXTAGE system, envisioned as a production robot that works alongside human workers.  The NEXTAGE not a biped but consists of a torso and arms on a fixed base.

Specifications 

Notes:
1. – For reference to compare with the HRP-1.
2. - The external appearances of HRP-2 and HRP-3 were designed by Yutaka Izubuchi.
3. – "C" means "Cybernetic Human".

References

Spec sheets 
 HRP-2P  - from Kawada Industries, Inc.
 HRP-2  - from Kawada Industries, Inc.
 HRP-3P  - from Kawada Industries, Inc.
 HRP-3  - from Kawada Industries, Inc.
 HRP-4  - from Kawada Industries, Inc.
 HTP-4  - from AIST

External links

 Kawada Industries, Inc. - Mechatronics  
 General Robotix,Inc 
 AIST Humanoid Robotics Group - academic side to the HRP project
 Press release about the HRP-4C 
 HRP-4 - The Bipedal Robot - Video demonstration

Robots of Japan
Humanoid robots
1990s robots
2000s robots